Aglapsvik is a small, isolated coastal village in Senja Municipality in Troms county in Northern Norway. The name of the village comes from the nearby mountain Aglapen. The area is mostly hilly and forested and there is one small road (County Road 263) passing through. There are about 50 residents.

References

External links
Google Earth location
Aglapsvik information

Senja
Populated places of Arctic Norway
Villages in Troms